At the 1998 FIFA World Cup, Brazil participated for the 16th time in the event. The country remained as the only national team to have participated in every installment of the FIFA World Cup. Brazil reached the final where they were defeated 3–0 by France.

Squad

Head coach: Mário Zagallo

Group matches

Brazil vs Scotland

Brazil vs Morocco

Brazil vs Norway

Second round

Brazil vs Chile

Quarter-final

Brazil vs Denmark

Semi-final

Brazil vs Netherlands

Final

References

External links 

 
Countries at the 1998 FIFA World Cup